Benjamin Vallentina Warley (September 4, 1936 – April 5, 2002) was an American professional basketball player.

A 6'5" forward/guard from Tennessee State University, Warley played five seasons (1962–1967) in the National Basketball Association as a member of the Syracuse Nationals, Philadelphia 76ers, and Baltimore Bullets. He averaged 8.4 points per game and 5.6 rebounds per game. Warley later played with several teams in the American Basketball Association, representing the Anaheim Amigos in the 1968 ABA All-Star Game.

Warley settled in Philadelphia after his playing career was over. He died of liver cancer in 2002.

Notes

1936 births
2002 deaths
Amateur Athletic Union men's basketball players
Anaheim Amigos players
American men's basketball players
Baltimore Bullets (1963–1973) players
Basketball players from Washington, D.C.
Cleveland Pipers players
Deaths from cancer in Pennsylvania
Deaths from liver cancer
Denver Rockets players
Long Beach Chiefs players
Los Angeles Lakers draft picks
Los Angeles Stars players
Philadelphia 76ers players
Seattle SuperSonics expansion draft picks
Shooting guards
Small forwards
Syracuse Nationals draft picks
Syracuse Nationals players
Tennessee State Tigers basketball players